Karaok  (Turkish: Black Arrow) is a 125 mm manportable, lightweight, fire-and-forget, short-range anti-tank guided missile (ATGM) in development by Roketsan.

Design
The missile is equipped with a tandem warhead and a new indigenously developed hybrid dual-stage rocket motor designed to enable fire from an enclosed space. Range was initially over 2500 m, weight is less than 16 kg (tube and missile), length is 110 cm. The missile is capable of both direct and top attack. The system is effective at both  day or night due to its Imaging Infrared Seeker.  This weapon system achieved  Initial Operational Capability (IOC) in 2020. This system will be inducted into the Turkish Army in 2022.

See also
 AT-1K Raybolt
 FGM-148 Javelin
 HJ-12
 Missile Moyenne Portée
 MPATGM
 NLAW
 Spike (missile)
 Type 01 LMAT

References

Anti-tank guided missiles
Anti-tank guided missiles of Turkey
Roketsan products